Elizabeth of Courtenay ) (c. 1199–1269 or later) was an Empress consort of Bulgaria, the daughter of Peter II of Courtenay and Yolanda of Flanders.

Elisabeth married tsar Boril of Bulgaria (died 1218), Walter of Bar-sur-Seine (died 1219) and then Eudes I Lord of Montaigu.
Elizabeth and Eudes had:
 Alexandre of Montagu, (1221–1249)
 Guillaume I, Lord of Montaigu, (1222–1300)
 Phillipe of Montagu, Lord of Chagny (born 1227) married Flore d'Antigny. Had a daughter Jeanne of Montagu.
 Gaucher of Montagu, Lord of Jambles, (born 1230)
 Eudes of Montagu, (born 1231)
Unnamed daughter, (died young)
Unnamed daughter, (died young)
Marguerite, Lady of Villeneuve, (born 1232)

Notes

References

Medieval Bulgarian nobility
Bulgarian consorts
12th-century births
13th-century deaths
Year of birth uncertain
Year of death unknown
Capetian House of Courtenay
Women of the Crusader states
Asen dynasty
13th-century Bulgarian people
13th-century Bulgarian women
12th-century Bulgarian people
12th-century Bulgarian women